Elena Likhovtseva and Magdalena Maleeva were the defending champions, but none competed this year. Likhovtseva competed in Auckland at the same week, while Maleeva retired from professional tennis in October 2005.

Dinara Safina and Meghann Shaughnessy won the title by defeating Cara Black and Rennae Stubbs 6–2, 6–3 in the final.

Seeds

Draw

Draw

References
 Main and Qualifying Draws

Mondial Australian Women's Hardcourts
2006 Mondial Australian Women's Hardcourts